Estadio Olímpico de Tapachula is a multi-purpose stadium in Tapachula, Chiapas, Mexico.  It is currently used mostly for football matches. The stadium seats 18,017 people. In 2015 the stadium was renovated in order to house Tapachula's Ascenso MX franchise,  Cafetaleros de Tapachula. In 2017 the stadium expanded to 22,000, adding 11,000 more seats from its 2015 renovation.

References

Tapachula
Sports venues in Chiapas